The Belgium women's national water polo team represents Belgium in international women's water polo competitions and friendly matches. Regarding major events (Summer Olympics, World Cups/Leagues and European Championships), as of 2013 it only qualified for the 1986 World Aquatics Championships where the team ended eighth.

Results

World Aquatics Championship

References

Women's national water polo teams
W